María París (born 20 May 1961) is a Costa Rican former swimmer. She competed at the 1976 Summer Olympics and the 1980 Summer Olympics.

References

1961 births
Living people
Costa Rican female swimmers
Pan American Games competitors for Costa Rica
Swimmers at the 1979 Pan American Games
Olympic swimmers of Costa Rica
Swimmers at the 1976 Summer Olympics
Swimmers at the 1980 Summer Olympics
Sportspeople from San José, Costa Rica
Central American and Caribbean Games gold medalists for Costa Rica
Central American and Caribbean Games medalists in swimming
Competitors at the 1974 Central American and Caribbean Games
Competitors at the 1978 Central American and Caribbean Games
20th-century Costa Rican women
21st-century Costa Rican women